The Missouri Pacific Railroad Depot-McGehee is a historic railroad station on Railroad Street in McGehee, Arkansas.  The single story brick building was built c. 1910 by the Missouri Pacific Railroad in its distinctive Mediterranean/Italianate style.  The building is of particular importance in McGehee because the town is located where it is due to the company's decision to locate the station here.  The station has a basic cruciform plan, an elongated rectangle with a projecting telegrapher's station on one side, and a matching projection on the other.  It has a red tile roof, with a spreading cornice supported by Italianate brackets.

The building was listed on the National Register of Historic Places in 1992.

See also
National Register of Historic Places listings in Desha County, Arkansas

References

Railway stations on the National Register of Historic Places in Arkansas
Railway stations in the United States opened in 1910
National Register of Historic Places in Desha County, Arkansas
McGehee
Mediterranean Revival architecture in Arkansas
Former railway stations in Arkansas